Her Majesty's Commissioners of Customs and Excise v Barclays Bank Plc [2006] UKHL 28 is a leading English tort law case concerning negligent misstatement and pure economic loss.

Facts
Customs and Excise needed to freeze the bank account of a Barclays customer. By law, banks are required to comply with requests for freezing orders and are paid for the service. When it received the request, the bank replied that it would abide. But due to "operator error", the customer proceeded to empty all of the money from the account. Customs and Excise sued Barclays for the amount that was lost along with the interest. Barclays argued it had no duty of care, nor had it assumed responsibility.

Judgment

Court of Appeal
Peter Gibson LJ, Longmore LJ, Lindsay LJ held that there was no duty and proposed that Hedley Byrne type assumption of responsibility should be subsumed into the threefold test from Caparo Industries plc v Dickman.

House of Lords
The House of Lords unanimously disapproved the Court of Appeal's decision, that "assumption of responsibility" was indistinct and subsumed into the law of negligence. It held, however, that in this case, because the bank was required by law to comply with the freezing order, there could not be said to have arisen any assumption of responsibility on Hedley Byrne grounds. Applying then the Caparo test, it was held to not be fair, just and reasonable to impose liability. The bank was therefore not required to reimburse Customs and Excise for the dissipated money.

See also
Negligence

Notes

References
C Mitchell and P Mitchell, 'Negligence Liability for Pure Economic Loss' (2005) 121 LQR 194-200

External links
Judgment from the House of Lords website

English tort case law
House of Lords cases
2006 in case law
2006 in British law
HM Revenue and Customs
Barclays litigation